Toka may refer to:

Places 

 Toka, the Hungarian name for  village, Hodac Commune, Mureș County, Romania
 Toka Gorge, in Norway
 Toka, Guyana, a village in Guyana
 Toka, a village near Nevasa in Maharashtra, India

People 

Tokaleya, people indigenous to the area surrounding Victoria Falls

Given name 

Toka Gaudi (born 1972), Papua New Guinean cricketer
Toka Natua (born 1991), rugby union and rugby league footballer

Surname 

Gaudi Toka (born 1994), Papua New Guinean cricketer
 Matt Toka, American musician
 Salchak Toka (1901–1973), Tuvan politician
 Taunga Toka, Cook Islands politician

Characters 

 Tokka and Rahzar, characters in the "Teenage Mutant Ninja Turtles" universe
 Tōka Kamiazuma, protagonist of Tōka Gettan
 Toka Heremaia, Shortland Street character
 Toka Yada (矢田 桃花), character from the Assassination Classroom manga and anime series

Other uses 

Toka (instrument), an instrument of Assam, India used in Bihu dance
 Toka, a sports game played by women of the Tohono O'odham people
Toka (company), a French video game company

See also

Tonka (disambiguation)
Toska (disambiguation)
Tova (disambiguation)